() is a historical set of attire in  consisting of a knee-length Chinese upper garment known as  over a , a Chinese skirt, known as  or pair of -trousersalong with other accessories. This set of attire was considered to be a ceremonial dress.

Construction and design 
This was typically worn over a red skirt known as  that reached the length of the ankles. The wearing of a  under an upper garment was only worn during formal occasions.

See also
Hanfu
List of Hanfu
Mianfu

References

Chinese traditional clothing